is a former member of the Supreme Court of Japan. He reached mandatory retirement age in 2012 and was succeeded by Masaharu Ōhashi.

References

Supreme Court of Japan justices
1942 births
Living people